Kirk Webby (born 30 September 1970) is a New Zealand equestrian. He competed in show jumping at the 2008 Summer Olympics in Beijing. Webby was a reserve for the New Zealand Olympic equestrian team and he and his horse were called up when Daniel Meech's horse Sorbas was ruled out due to injury.

References

1970 births
Living people
New Zealand male equestrians
Olympic equestrians of New Zealand
Equestrians at the 2008 Summer Olympics